The Electric Swing Circus are a six piece electro swing band based in Birmingham, England. The line up features Vicki Olivia (vocals), Fe Salomon  (vocals), Tom Hyland (guitar), Rashad Gregory (samples, MPC & synths) and Patrick Wreford (electric double bass and bass synth). The Electric Swing Circus formed in June 2011. The band's preview EP, Penniless Optimist, was released in September 2011, and their debut album "Electric Swing Circus" in May 2013. They released their second album "It Flew By" in January 2017. They released their third album "Pleasure Seekers" in March 2022.

History

2011
The Electric Swing Circus had their first live performance at the Book Club on 17 September 2011.  The band also recorded the video for ‘’Penniless Optimist’’, which was filmed in Boxxed by Realm Pictures.

During October 2011 Penniless Optimist was remixed by C@ in the H@ and Sam Redmore. Penniless Optimist received airplay on BBC Radio 6 on The Craig Charles Funk and Soul Show.  The video for Penniless Optimist was also shown on BBC Big Screens nationwide.

At the ElectroSwing People's Favourite Awards, The Electric Swing Circus won Best Live Act award in December 2011.

Electric Swing Circus has a residency at Hot Club de Swing, a club night at the Hare and Hounds, Birmingham.

2012
The Electric Swing Circus played many festivals during 2012, including Bestival, Secret Garden Party, Nozstock, Boomtown, Beat-Herder, Fieldview and WOMAD.

2013 - Debut album Electric Swing Circus released
The Electric Swing Circus filmed the video for the single Valentine in March 2013. It was filmed in Birmingham Municipal Bank and premièred at Swingamajig Festival in May that year.

On 9 May 2013, the band released their self-titled debut album.

Over the European summer, the band played several big name festivals, including their biggest show to date on the Spirit of 71' / Glade stage Glastonbury Festival, Shambala (where they brought their own tent, the Swingamajig Speakeasy to the festival) and Fusion Festival. These shows helped to establish the band as firm festival favourites. They were listed in the Glastonbury guide as "one of the highlights of Glastonbury"

2014
Off the back of the success of the debut album, Electric Swing Circus carried on touring, now a mainstay at all UK festivals and starting to branch further out to play all of Europe. 
The band also played Edinburgh festival for the first time, having a residency with the Assembly group, whilst also performing on the BBC stage, who described them as "Electro-swing at its best".

2015
ESC headlined the Avalon Stage on the last night of Glastonbury festival. Towards the end of 2015 they began to record their second album.

2016 - Recording and European tour 
The band recorded their second album mostly at the beginning of 2016. The band ran another successful crowdfunded campaign to help fund the new album and recorded at Middle Farm and Giant Wafer studios. The band played Swingamajig festival, where they released "Empires EP (Swingamajig Edition)" and included the tracks "Empires" and "Hit&Run" which were the first tracks recorded for the new album. The band returned to the studio to complete their second album which was titled It Flew By.

2017 and It Flew By
2017 marked the release of their second album It Flew By

The Soul of a Clown blog said "Electric Swing Circus are quite rightly regarded as one of the leading lights in the electro swing scene. Unlike others they have not settled for covers or to being restricted by that style. This album shows them continuing to grow and develop their sound. It steps away from the clichés to allow them to have a far wider appeal"

2019 and "Connected/ Invisible Man E.P."
Following initial recording sessions in late 2018, ESC released the "Connected/ Invisible Man E.P." recorded with long-term collaborator and producer James Bragg. They followed this with video's for every track on the E.P. The relentless tour schedule continued including prestigious headline slots at festivals all over Europe, including Heitere Open Air Festival In Switzerland.

2022 and "Pleasure Seekers"

The third album from Electric Swing Circus "Pleasure Seekers" was released in March 2022, and includes the singles "Gravity" and "Expectations".

Swingamajig Festival
In May 2013, the band hosted a one-day festival in Digbeth, Birmingham, which was the first of its kind in the UK. Headline acts included The Correspondents, Dutty Moonshine, Odjbox and Pierre, DJ Switch and C@ in the H@. The festival sold out.

In May 2014, the second Swingamajig Festival took place in Digbeth, with many well-reputed acts including Molotov Jukebox, featuring Natalie Tena.

The third festival in 2015 featured Chinese man, and the fourth in 2016 featured Balkan Beat Box as headliners.

This is the Electric Swing Circus's very own festival which they co headline every year.

Band members
 Vicki Olivia – Vocals
 Fe Salomon – Vocals 
 Marcus Copeland - Drums
 Tom Hyland – Guitar & Vocals
 Rashad Gregory – Samples, MPC & Synths
 Patrick Wreford – Bass Guitar/Double Bass & Bass Synth
 Bridge Williams – Sound

Former band members
 Laura Owen-Wright - Vocals
 Bridget Walsh - Vocals
 Eleanor Rose - Vocals
 Chandra Walker - Drums/keys

Discography
 Penniless Optimist (2011)
 Penniless Optimist Premix EP (2011)
 The Electric Swing Circus (2013)
 Empires EP (Swingamajig Edition) (2016)
 It Flew By (2017)
 Connected/ Invisible Man (2019)
 Pleasure Seekers (2022)

References

External links
 Official website
 Swingamajig Festival

Musical groups established in 2011
Musical groups from Birmingham, West Midlands
Electro swing musicians
English electronic music groups
2011 establishments in England